Cheshmeh Shur (also Romanized as Cheshmeh Shūr) is a village in Khangiran Rural District, in the Central District of Sarakhs County, Razavi Khorasan Province, Iran. At the 2006 census, its population was 524, in 114 families.

References 

Populated places in Sarakhs County